Ralph G. Wright (born June 10, 1935) is a retired teacher and politician who served as Speaker of the Vermont House of Representatives.

Early life
Ralph Wright was born in Arlington, Massachusetts on June 10, 1935. He served in the United States Marine Corps during the Korean War and graduated from Boston University with a Bachelor of Arts degree and Framingham State University with a master's degree in education.

Career
Wright moved to Bennington, Vermont in 1968 and was a teacher and director of an alternative education program for troubled teens.

A Democrat, Wright served in local offices in Bennington during the 1960s and 1970s, including Selectman.  In 1978 he won election to the Vermont House of Representatives, where he served from 1979 to 1995.  From 1983 to 1985 Wright was the House Minority Leader.

In 1985 Wright was elected Speaker of the House, a victory remarkable for the fact that Republicans were in the majority.

Serving as Speaker for 10 years, Wright's candidate recruiting and campaign support work, carried out in conjunction with other Democrats including Representative Paul N. Poirier, who became the House majority leader, saw Democrats become the majority party in the House during Wright's final term.

Wright was defeated for reelection to the House in the Republican sweep of 1994.

At 10 years, Ralph Wright's term remains the longest of any Vermont Speaker of the House.

Later life
After leaving the Vermont House, Wright worked briefly as a lobbyist before accepting a position as Special Assistant to the United States Secretary of Education, based in the Boston, Massachusetts regional office.

He also authored a memoir, 1996's All Politics Is Personal.

Retirement
In 2000 Wright retired and relocated to Florida.  He authored another book, 2005's Inside the Statehouse: Lessons From the Speaker and was an adjunct professor at Lake-Sumter State College.

References 

1935 births
Speakers of the Vermont House of Representatives
Democratic Party members of the Vermont House of Representatives
People from Bennington, Vermont
People from Arlington, Massachusetts
Military personnel from Massachusetts
United States Marine Corps personnel of the Korean War
United States Marines
Framingham State University alumni
Boston University alumni
Living people
Writers from Florida
Writers from Massachusetts
Writers from Vermont
21st-century American male writers
20th-century American politicians
20th-century American male writers
Vermont city council members
20th-century American educators
American political writers
Schoolteachers from Vermont
American memoirists